Hempel A/S is a global supplier of coatings and services in the protective, marine, decorative, container and yacht industries. Hempel factories, R&D centres and stock points are established in every region and the company was founded in Copenhagen, Denmark in 1915.

It is fully owned by the Hempel Foundation, whose primary purpose is to maintain a solid financial and economic base for the Hempel Group. The secondary focus of the Foundation is philanthropic; sustaining our planet’s biodiversity, supporting research into sustainable coating technology and empowering children living in poverty to learn through education.

History

Hempel was founded by Jørgen Christian Hempel (1894 – 30 January 1986) in July 1915, when he established Hempel’s Marine Paints Ltd. (J.C. Hempel’s Skibsfarve–Fabrik A/S), a marine paint wholesaler. At just twenty one years of age, he was Denmark’s youngest licensed wholesaler at the time. The following year, he set up his own paint mixing factory.

In 1917, Hempel collaborated with the Technical University of Denmark, to develop Hempel’s first antifouling coating for ships’ hulls.

During the 1950s and 1960s, Hempel expanded around the globe. It established its first factory in the United States in 1951, and opened an office in Hong Kong in 1963. In the 1960s, the company began to produce decorative coatings for the Middle East, and it opened its first factory in the region, in Kuwait, in 1966.

In the 1970s, Hempel established a Protective coatings division to develop and produce coatings for the industrial market, such as power generation and infrastructure. Hempel was one of the first coatings companies to focus on renewable energies and it supplied coatings to the first commercial wind farm in 1980.

J.C. Hempel died in 1986, 91 years of age, having led the company for seventy one years. By 2000, Hempel had become a widespread group, with local management in thirty eight countries. During the following decade, it consolidated, buying out its partners in Croatia, China, Morocco and the Middle East.

Acquisitions
Significant acquisitions since 2000 include:
Crown Paints, a leading paint manufacturer in the United Kingdom (June 2011)
Blome International Inc., a producer based in the United States of specialist coatings for the protective industry (July 2012)
Schaepman, a Dutch supplier of specialist industrial, protective and decorative coatings (December 2014)
Jones Blair Company, a leading North American supplier for the protective and waterproofing markets (February 2015)
J.W. Ostendorf, a decorative coatings company with operations primarily in Germany and France (May 2018)
Wattyl, a decorative, protective and marine coatings company with operations in Australia and New Zealand (March 2021)
 Farrow & Ball, a British manufacturer of paints and wallpaper (May 2021)

Headquarters

Hempel moved into a new headquarters in April 2013. The building is located in Lundtoftegårdsvej in Lundtofte, north of Copenhagen. The building is designed by Årstiderne Arkitekter. Hempel's old headquarters were sold to DTU.

In 2021, a new R&D facility, Hempel Campus, opened across the road from the existing headquarters, connected by pedestrian overpass.

References

External links
 Hempel HQ location in Google Maps

Paint manufacturers
Chemical companies of Denmark
Manufacturing companies based in Copenhagen
Companies based in Lyngby-Taarbæk Municipality
Danish companies established in 1915
Purveyors to the Court of Denmark
Danish brands